The Orissa Tributary States, also known as the Garhjats and as the Orissa Feudatory States, were a group of princely states of British India now part of the present-day Indian state of Odisha.

The Orissa Tributary States were located in the Garhjat Hills, the hilly and former heavily forested region of eastern Orissa, on the border with present-day Chhattisgarh and Jharkhand states.

History

In the 18th century, the entire region came under the control of the Maratha Empire, in particular the Bhonsle maharajas of Nagpur. Meanwhile, the British had become established in Bengal, and were expanding their influence into the lowland tracts of Orissa. The British and the Marathas came into conflict in the late 18th century, and at the conclusion of the Second Anglo-Maratha War in 1803, the Maharaja of Nagpur ceded Orissa to the British. Some of the former Maratha territory was ruled directly by the British, and attached to the Bengal Presidency; other territories became princely states, under the control of local rulers under a treaty of subsidiary alliance to the British monarch following the annexation in 1803. The local chiefs' status was recognised by the British as 'tributary chiefs' and their estates became the 'Tributary Mahals' of Orissa.

These territories were managed the Political Department and were not subject to any regular Settlement and Revenue system. Originally there were nineteen Tributary States, but two of them were confiscated and annexed by the British; Angul State in 1847 for the rebellion of its Raja when he opposed the British officers that had been sent to suppress the Meriah sacrifice among the Khonds, and Banki State in 1840, after its ruler had been convicted of murder.

The status of the Orissa Tributary States, the largest of which were Mayurbhanj, Keonjhar, Dhenkanal, Baudh, and Nayagarh, was unclear until 1888, when the Secretary of State for India accepted the view that they did not form part of British India, and modified powers were handed over to the Orissa chiefs under the control of a superintendent.

In 1905 five Oriya-speaking states of Bamra, Rairakhol, Sonpur, Patna, and Kalahandi State) were added from the Central Provinces and two states, Gangpur and Bonai, from the Chota Nagpur States.

In 1912, the province of Bihar and Orissa was detached from Bengal, and the Orissa Tributary States were under the authority of the governor of Bihar and Orissa. In 1936 Orissa became a separate province, but the Orissa Tributary States were merged into the Eastern States Agency, which was under the direct authority of the Governor-General of India rather than that of the provincial governor. After the Indian independence in 1947, the rulers of the states acceded to the Government of India. They established the Eastern States Union in the same year. Their aim was to establish a unit that would be large enough to exist as a separate state within the Indian Union. But the union failed and the former Orissa Tributary States, except the Oriya speaking princely states of Saraikela and Kharsawan, were integrated into the state of Orissa.

Princely states
The list of princely states under Orissa States Agency:

See also
Sambalpur State
Banki State
Eastern States Agency
Chota Nagpur Tributary States
Political integration of India

References

Princely states of Odisha
Bengal Presidency
1888 establishments in India